The 51st New York State Legislature, consisting of the New York State Senate and the New York State Assembly, met from January 1 to December 10, 1828, during the fourth year of DeWitt Clinton's second tenure as Governor of New York, and—after Clinton's death—while Nathaniel Pitcher was Governor, in Albany.

Background
Under the provisions of the New York Constitution of 1821, 32 Senators were elected on general tickets in eight senatorial districts for four-year terms. They were divided into four classes, and every year eight Senate seats came up for election. Assemblymen were elected countywide on general tickets to a one-year term, the whole Assembly being renewed annually.

State Senator Cadwallader D. Colden resigned on August 30, 1827, leaving a vacancy in the First District.

Before the time of the election in November 1827, the Democratic-Republican Party was split into two factions: the "Bucktails" (led by U.S. Senator Martin Van Buren) and the "Clintonians" (supporters of Gov. DeWitt Clinton). In view of the 1828 United States presidential election, the parties re-aligned: most of the Bucktails became "Jacksonians" (supporters of Andrew Jackson for U.S. president); and most of the Clintonians became "Adams men" (supporters of the re-election of John Quincy Adams).

On September 11, 1826, began the affair surrounding the abduction, and probable murder, of William Morgan which led to the foundation of the Anti-Masonic Party in 1828.

Elections
The State election was held from November 5 to 7, 1827. John I. Schenck (1st D.), Walker Todd (2nd D.), Moses Warren (3rd D.), Reuben Sanford (4th D.), Nathaniel S. Benton (5th D.), Grattan H. Wheeler (6th D.), George B. Throop (7th D.) and Timothy H. Porter (8th D.) were elected to full terms in the Senate. Jacob Tyson (1st D.) was elected to fill the vacancy.

Sessions
The Legislature met for the regular session at the Old State Capitol in Albany on January 2, 1828, and adjourned on April 21.

Erastus Root (Jacksonian) was re-elected Speaker unopposed.

On January 5, Lt. Gov. Pitcher informed the State Senate that he was too ill to attend the session, and Peter R. Livingston (J) was elected Temporary President of the State Senate.

On January 31, a caucus of Jacksonian legislators nominated Andrew Jackson for U.S. president.

On February 11, Gov. DeWitt Clinton died—the only governor in New York history to die in office—and Lt. Gov. Pitcher became governor for the remainder of the year.

The Legislature appointed Daniel Moseley as Special Prosecutor to detect and punish the murderers of William Morgan.

The Legislature created the Superior Court of Common Pleas of New York City. Chancellor Samuel Jones was appointed Chief Justice; and Josiah Ogden Hoffman and Congressman Thomas J. Oakley associate justices.

On June 10, a state convention of Adams men met at Albany, and nominated U.S. President John Quincy Adams for re-election.

On July 22, a state convention of Adams men met at Utica; James Fairlie was Chairman; and Tilly Lynde and Thomas Clowes were Secretaries. They nominated U.S. Supreme Court Justice Smith Thompson for Governor, and Assemblyman Francis Granger for Lieutenant Governor.

The Anti-Masonic state convention nominated Assemblyman Francis Granger for Governor, and State Senator John Crary for Lieutenant Governor. Granger declined to run for this office on this ticket, and expected Crary to decline too, so that he, Granger, could be endorsed by the Anti-Masons for Lieutenant Governor. Crary, however, did not decline and ran on the Anti-Masonic ticket with Solomon Southwick for Governor.

The Jacksonian state convention met at Herkimer and nominated U.S. Senator Martin Van Buren for Governor and Circuit Judge Enos T. Throop for Lieutenant Governor.

The Legislature met for a special session on September 9; and adjourned on December 10. At this session the debate on the report of the Board of Revisers of the State Statutes continued.

On October 7, Charles Dayan was elected president pro tempore of the State Senate.

State Senate

Districts
 The First District (4 seats) consisted of Kings, New York, Queens, Richmond and Suffolk counties.
 The Second District (4 seats) consisted of Delaware, Dutchess, Orange, Putnam, Rockland, Sullivan, Ulster and Westchester counties.
 The Third District (4 seats) consisted of Albany, Columbia, Greene, Rensselaer, Schenectady and Schoharie counties.
 The Fourth District (4 seats) consisted of Clinton, Essex, Franklin, Hamilton, Montgomery, St. Lawrence, Saratoga, Warren and Washington counties.
 The Fifth District (4 seats) consisted of Herkimer, Jefferson, Lewis, Madison, Oneida and Oswego counties.
 The Sixth District (4 seats) consisted of Broome, Chenango, Cortland, Otsego, Steuben, Tioga and Tompkins counties.
 The Seventh District (4 seats) consisted of Cayuga, Onondaga, Ontario, Seneca, Wayne and Yates counties.
 The Eighth District (4 seats) consisted of Allegany, Cattaraugus, Chautauqua, Erie, Genesee, Livingston, Monroe, Niagara and Orleans counties.

Note: There are now 62 counties in the State of New York. The counties which are not mentioned in this list had not yet been established, or sufficiently organized, the area being included in one or more of the abovementioned counties.

Members
The asterisk (*) denotes members of the previous Legislature who continued in office as members of this Legislature.

Employees
 Clerk: John F. Bacon

State Assembly

Districts

 Albany County (3 seats)
 Allegany County (1 seat)
 Broome County (1 seat)
 Cattaraugus County (1 seat)
 Cayuga County (4 seats)
 Chautauqua County (2 seats)
 Chenango County (3 seats)
 Clinton County (1 seat)
 Columbia County (3 seats)
 Cortland County (2 seats)
 Delaware County (2 seats)
 Dutchess County (4 seats)
 Erie County (2 seats)
 Essex County (1 seat)
 Franklin County (1 seat)
 Genesee County (3 seats)
 Greene County (2 seats)
 Hamilton and Montgomery counties (3 seats)
 Herkimer County (3 seats)
 Jefferson County (3 seats)
 Kings County (1 seat)
 Lewis County (1 seat)
 Livingston County (2 seats)
 Madison County (3 seats)
 Monroe County (3 seats)
 The City and County of New York (11 seats)
 Niagara County (1 seat)
 Oneida County (5 seats)
 Onondaga County (4 seats)
 Ontario County (3 seats)
 Orange County (3 seats)
 Orleans County (1 seat)
 Oswego County (1 seat)
 Otsego County (4 seats)
 Putnam County (1 seat)
 Queens County (1 seat)
 Rensselaer County (4 seats)
 Richmond County (1 seat)
 Rockland County (1 seat)
 St. Lawrence County (2 seats)
 Saratoga County (3 seats)
 Schenectady County (1 seat)
 Schoharie County (2 seats)
 Seneca County (2 seats)
 Steuben County (2 seats)
 Suffolk County (2 seats)
 Sullivan County (1 seat)
 Tioga County (2 seats)
 Tompkins County (3 seats)
 Ulster County (2 seats)
 Warren County (1 seat)
 Washington (3 seats)
 Wayne County (2 seats)
 Westchester County (3 seats)
 Yates County (1 seat)

Note: There are now 62 counties in the State of New York. The counties which are not mentioned in this list had not yet been established, or sufficiently organized, the area being included in one or more of the abovementioned counties.

Assemblymen
The asterisk (*) denotes members of the previous Legislature who continued as members of this Legislature.

Employees
 Clerk: Francis Seger
 Sergeant-at-Arms: John C. Ellis
 Doorkeeper: William Seely
 Assistant Doorkeeper: James D. Scollard

Notes

Sources
 The New York Civil List compiled by Franklin Benjamin Hough (Weed, Parsons and Co., 1858) [see pg. 109 and 441 for Senate districts; pg. 127 for senators; pg. 148f for Assembly districts; pg. 206f for assemblymen]
 The History of Political Parties in the State of New-York, from the Ratification of the Federal Constitution to 1840 by Jabez D. Hammond (4th ed., Vol. 2, Phinney & Co., Buffalo, 1850; pg. 258 to 288)

051
1828 in New York (state)
1828 U.S. legislative sessions